Three Rivers is a town within Kings County in Prince Edward Island that was incorporated on September 28, 2018, through an amalgamation of seven municipalities and adjacent unincorporated areas. The municipalities that were amalgamated included two towns – Georgetown and Montague – and five rural municipalities – Brudenell, Cardigan, Lorne Valley, Lower Montague, and Valleyfield.

Demographics 

Government 
The Town of Three Rivers was governed by an interim council comprising an interim mayor (Merrill Scott) and ten interim councillors. Seven of these interim councillors were the former mayors of the two towns and the five rural municipalities, while the three others were provincially-appointed representatives of the previously unincorporated areas. The first election for a mayor and twelve councillors was held on November 5, 2018, resulting in Edward MacAulay being selected as mayor and Jane King, Alan Munro, Gerard Holland, Ronald Nicholson, Cameron MacLean, David McGrath, Cindy MacLean, Cody Jenkins, Isaac MacIntyre, Debra Johnston, John MacFarlane, Wayne Spin as council members.

Three byelections took place between the 2018 and 2022 elections. MacIntyre resigned and his seat was won by Paul Morrison. Spin's resignation led to a byelection won by Larry Creed. Nicholson later resigned and was replaced by Hannah Martens.

As of the November 2022 municipal election, the size of council will be reduced from 12 to 8.

References

External links 

Towns in Prince Edward Island
Populated places established in 2018
2018 establishments in Prince Edward Island